László József Örvendi (born 1951) is a Hungarian politician, member of the National Assembly (MP) from Fidesz Hajdú-Bihar County Regional List between 2006 and 2014.

Örvendi is a member of the presidium of the National Alliance of Hungarian Farmers (MAGOSZ). He joined Independent Smallholders, Agrarian Workers and Civic Party (FKGP) in 2001. He became a member of the General Assembly of Hajdú-Bihar County in 2002. Later he joined Fidesz. He was a member of the Committee on Agriculture from May 30, 2006 to May 13, 2010. After the 2010 parliamentary election, he was elected a member of the Committee on Consumer Protection on May 14, 2010.

References

1951 births
Living people
Hungarian engineers
Independent Smallholders, Agrarian Workers and Civic Party politicians
Fidesz politicians
Members of the National Assembly of Hungary (2006–2010)
Members of the National Assembly of Hungary (2010–2014)
People from Hajdú-Bihar County